Ahmed Alaoui (born 1949) is a Moroccan football forward who played for Morocco in the 1970 FIFA World Cup. He also played for RS Settat.

References

1949 births
Moroccan footballers
Morocco international footballers
Association football forwards
RS Settat players
Botola players
1970 FIFA World Cup players
Competitors at the 1979 Mediterranean Games
Living people
People from Settat
Mediterranean Games competitors for Morocco
20th-century Moroccan people